The Best American Short Stories 2003, a volume in The Best American Short Stories series, was edited by Katrina Kennison and by guest editor Walter Mosley.

Short stories included

Other notable stories

Among the other notable writers whose stories were among the "100 Other Distinguished Stories of 2002" were Andrea Barrett, Rick Bass, Robert Coover, Donald Hall, Joyce Carol Oates, Grace Paley, John Updike and John Edgar Wideman.

Notes

2003 anthologies
Fiction anthologies
Short Stories 2003
Houghton Mifflin books